The 2016–17 Liga Nacional de Fútbol de Guatemala season is the 19th season in which the Apertura and Clausura season is used. The season began on 2016 and will end in 2017.

Format
The format for both championships are identical. Each championship will have two stages: a first stage and a playoff stage. The first stage of each championship is a double round-robin format. The teams that finish first and second in the standings will advance to the playoffs semifinals, while the teams that finish 3–6 will enter in the quarterfinals. The winner of each quarterfinal will advance to the semifinals. The winners of the semifinals will advance to the finals, which will determine the tournament champion.

Apertura
The 2016 Torneo Apertura began in July 2016 and will end in December 2016.

Personnel and sponsoring

Table

Standings

Positions by round

Results

Playoffs

Quarterfinals

First leg

Second leg 

Comunicaciones won 2–0 on aggregate.

Malacateco won 1–0 on aggregate.

Semifinals

First leg

Second leg 

Municipal won 2–1 on aggregate.

1-1 on aggregate. Antigua GFC progresses as the higher seed.

Finals

First leg

Second leg 

2-2 on aggregate. Antigua GFC wins 5-4 on penalties.

Managerial changes

Beginning of the season

During the season

List of foreign players in the league
This is a list of foreign players in 2016-2017 season. The following players:
have played at least one apertura game for the respective club.
have not been capped for the Guatemala national football team on any level, independently from the birthplace

A new rule was introduced a few season ago, that clubs can only have five foreign players per club and can only add a new player if there is an injury or player/s is released.

Antigua GFC
  Víctor Bolivar
  Jorge Zaldívar
  Manfred Russell

Coban Imperial
  Francisco Ladogana
  Orlando Moreira
  Víctor Solalinde
  Álvaro García

CSD Comunicaciones  
  Juan Barrera
  Diego Estrada
  Joel Benítez
  Emiliano Lopez

Guastatoya  

' Deportivo Mictlan
  Juan Aguirre
  Marlon Negrete
  William Negrete
  Ricardo Romero

Deportivo Malacateco
  Juan Carlos Meza
  Jhon Jairo Palacios
  Carlos Díaz 
  Ricardo Rocha

 (player released during the season)

Deportivo Marquense
  Matías Triofini

CSD Municipal 
  Darío Flores 
  Carlos Kamiani
  Janderson Pereira
  Jaime Alas
  Gastón Puerari

Deportivo Petapa
  Juan Lovato
  Adrian Apellaniz
  Matías Quinteros

CD Suchitepéquez
  Francisco Ladogana 
  Mauricio Gerni 
  Omar Salazar
  David Monsalve

Carchá
  Pablo Pereira
  Cesar Ivan Garcia
  Luis Rene Rodas
  Kamar Kayode Oshioke

Club Xelajú MC
  Cristhian Lagos
  Juliano Rangel de Andrade
  Juan Baena
  José Mendoza

Clausura
The 2017 Torneo Clausura is expected to begin in January 2017 and end in May 2017.

Personnel and sponsoring

Table

Standings

Positions by round

Results

Playoffs

Quarterfinals

First leg

Second leg 

Guastatoya won 4–2 on aggregate.

Suchitepéquez won 1–0 on aggregate.

Semifinals

First leg

Second leg 

Municipal won 3–1 on aggregate.

Guastatoya won 5-4 on aggregate.

Finals

First leg

Second leg 

Municipal won 2-0 on aggregate.

Aggregate table
Three teams would have qualified for CONCACAF club competitions, but due to FIFA's suspension of Guatemala, these spots were given to other Central American countries.

External links
 http://www.prensalibre.com/Deportes/FutbolNacional
 https://web.archive.org/web/20150813211930/http://lared.com.gt/pages/sec_noticia/113

Liga Nacional de Fútbol de Guatemala seasons
1
Guatemala